Motor Rail was a British locomotive-building company, originally based in Lewes, Sussex, they moved in 1916 to Bedford. Loco manufacture ceased in 1987, and the business line sold to Alan Keef Ltd of Ross-on-Wye, who continue to provide spares and have built several locomotives to Motor Rail designs.

History
The origins of the Motor Rail company can be traced back to the patenting of a gearbox by John Dixon Abbott of Eastbourne in 1909 ("Change speed and reversing gearbox suitable for use in motor-trams", UK Patent 18314). In March 1911, he formed The Motor Rail & Tramcar Co Ltd, with his father John Abbott and brother Tom Dixon Abbott. The stated aim of the business was developing the gearbox and incorporating it in tramcars and railcars. At about the same time operations moved to Lewes, Sussex and rented space in the Phoenix Foundry of John Every, where they developed a narrow-gauge rail vehicle around the Dixon-Abbott gearbox using a twin cylinder water-cooled Dorman engine.

In January 1916, the company answered a War Department tender for military supply railways. The company designed a new locomotive, with outer longitudinal "bent-rail" frame, mounted on two driven axles. The 2JO petrol engine manufactured by W.H. Dorman & Co of Stafford was centre-set in the frame along with its Dixon-Abbott patent gearbox, which drove the unsprung axles through a chain-drive. At one end of the frame the operator sat facing to one side allowing him to drive equally well in either direction, and at the other end was the silencer and the water cooling radiator  mounted with fan to provide transverse air flow. A large flywheel gave relatively smooth operation.

After approval by the War Department of the prototype, a small order was placed for evaluation in France. Success here led to significant orders and as a result the company moved to new premises in Houghton Rd, Bedford in May 1916. John Abbott died in August 1916, and John Dixon Abbott took over as chairman.

A second but armoured version was made to a specification defined by the Ministry of Munitions. This used an upgraded Dorman 4JO 40 hp engine and two speed gearbox, coming in three versions:
Open: armoured end plates plus height-adjustable canopy on pillars
Protected: as Open, plus armoured side doors and visors
Armoured: completely enclosed with armour-plated roof, and end slits for the driver to look through

The Dorman engine used by Motor Rail from the earliest days was reported in 1918 to have been "designed by Mr Abbott, in conjunction with W.H. Dorman Ltd of Stafford", which could explain why the company exclusively used this engine. The same article states that the WW1 production of the Dixon-Abbott gearbox was contracted out to David Brown Ltd. of Huddersfield.

With over 900 such locomotives supplied to the WD and MoM, post-WW1 the resultant large and cheap supply of these trench tractors opened up the use of internal combustion engine powered locomotives to many new and existing applications, where steam engines were either too heavy or too expensive thus allowing cheaper operations. The company had found its niche, and continued to build petrol and diesel-engined locomotives, mainly for narrow gauge railways.

In 1931, the company changed its name from Motor Rail & Tram Car Co to Motor Rail Ltd. The trade name Simplex was registered in 1953, though the name Simplex was in use by the company as early as 1915. In 1972 the company was renamed Simplex Mechanical Handling Ltd.

Locomotives

Other products
In the early stage of its development, the Motor Rail & Tram Car Company was involved in developing self-propelled tramcars, though the extent of production is not clear. In 1915, The Engineer magazine reported on the Simplex Rail Coach made in Lewes with the Brush Company building the body, delivered to the South Indian Railway Company where it was expected to be run on the Pamban Viaduct line. The coach weighed 12 tons, would carry 70 people, and was powered by a four-cylinder Dorman petrol engine rated at 45 bhp. The tram car part of the company name was dropped in 1931, so it is presumed there was no tram car part of the business beyond this date.

In 1919, Motor Rail manufactured some standard gauge inspection cars for the Ministry of Munitions, and the testing of these cars on the branch line between Bedford and Hitchin was reported in The Engineer. The cars were powered by the two cylinder Dorman engine with Dixon-Abbott 2-speed gearbox, and averaged over 30 mph on the test, and reached 43 mph. One of the cars was run on paraffin, though it was intended they would be run on petrol. They were lightweight at only 3.25 tons, though could carry up to 2 tons payload if required. The seating being easily removable to offer load space.

In 1939, Motor Rail introduced the Motor Rail Dumper - a 4-ton, 2-wheel-drive dump truck (running on tyres rather than rails). It again used a Dorman engine, and a variant of the Dixon-Abbot gearbox. A working example (works number 8389 of 1947) with Dorman engine can be found at the Moseley Railway Trust. According to a 1955 advert, the diesel engine dumper had a capacity of 3 cubic yards, and had six forward gears and two reverse. It would carry a load of 4 tons up a 1 in 5 gradient. It was available with front control (driver at the front facing forward), or rear control (driver looking over the load, and hence with rear wheel steering, as is common modern practice). New models of this dumper for 1960 were the MR450 with 4.5 cubic yard capacity, reversible seat, and three speeds in either direction using a Dorman 37 bhp 2LB diesel engine; and the MR375 with 3.75 cubic yards capacity and 6 forward and 2 reverse gears which had a Lister 33 bhp HA3 air-cooled engine.

Preserved locomotives
Many Motor Rail products survive in preservation, and they are probably the most common make of narrow gauge locomotive still in existence in the United Kingdom.

Heritage railways with Motor Rail locomotives include:
 Almond Valley Light Railway
 Amberley Museum Railway
 Battlefield Line Railway 
 Chasewater Railway
 Corris Railway
 East Anglian Railway Museum
 East Lancashire Railway
 Ffestiniog Railway
 Golden Valley Light Railway
 Giant's Causeway and Bushmills Railway
 Great Bush Railway
 Great Central Railway
 International Rhine Regulation Railway (Austria)
 Lakeside and Haverthwaite Railway
 Lea Bailey Light Railway
 Leadhills and Wanlockhead Railway
 Leighton Buzzard Light Railway
 Lincolnshire Coast Light Railway
 Meirion Mill Railway
 Moseley Railway Trust
 Old Kiln Light Railway
 Ouche Valley Railway (France)
 Romney, Hythe and Dymchurch Railway
 Volk's Electric Railway
 Wales West Light Railway (USA)
 Welsh Highland Railway
 West Lancashire Light Railway
 Wicksteed Park, Kettering, Northamptonshire

See also 
 Lister Rail-Truck, a similar light locomotive, from R A Lister of Dursley

References 

 

Locomotive manufacturers of the United Kingdom
Vehicle manufacturing companies established in 1911
Petrol locomotives
1911 establishments in England
Companies based in Sussex
Companies based in Bedfordshire